The 1933 Creighton Bluejays football team was an American football team that represented Creighton University as a member of the Missouri Valley Conference (MVC) during the 1933 college football season. In its fourth and final season under head coach Arthur R. Stark, the team compiled a 3–4–1 record (2–2 against MVC opponents) and was outscored by a total of 80 to 60. The team played its home games at Creighton Stadium in Omaha, Nebraska.

Schedule

References

Creighton
Creighton Bluejays football seasons
Creighton Bluejays football